The Fokker F-14 was an American seven/nine passenger transport aircraft designed by Fokker and built by their Atlantic Aircraft factory in New Jersey.

Development
The F-14 was a typical Fokker designed single-engine transport but unusually it had a parasol-type high wing carried on struts above the fuselage. It had a fixed tailwheel landing gear. The pilot had a cockpit behind the passenger cabin.

Variants
F-14
Civil production version with a 525 hp (391 kW) Wright R-1750-3 radial engine.
F-14A
Civilian aircraft with 575 hp (429 kW) Pratt & Whitney R-1690 Hornet radial and wing mounted directly on fuselage.

Y1C-14
Designation for 20 Hornet-powered examples bought for the United States Army Air Corps in 1931, later became the C-14.
Y1C-14A
Last of the 20 Y1C-14s re-engined with a 575 hp (429 kW) Wright R-1820-7 Cyclone.
Y1C-14B
Re-engined with a 525 hp (391 kW) Pratt & Whitney R-1690-5 Hornet.

Y1C-15
Conversion of the ninth Y1C-14 as an air ambulance.
Y1C-15A
F-14 re-engined with a 575 hp (429 kW) Wright R-1820 Cyclone, later C-15A.

Operators

MacKenzie Air Services
Western Canada Airways

 Standard Air Lines
 Transcontinental & Western Air
 United States Army Air Corps

Specifications (F-14)

References
 John Andrade, U.S.Military Aircraft Designations and Serials since 1909, Midland Counties Publications, 1979,  (Page 62)
 The Illustrated Encyclopedia of Aircraft (Part Work 1982-1985), 1985, Orbis Publishing, Page 1878.

External links

 "Mercy Flyers Bring" rare photos of USAAC ambulance version page 20 (top) and page 21 (bottom)
 "Ambulance Plan `Chute Designed For Patients" June 1934 Popular Science Monthly - Y1C-15 used for testing of emergency parachute for stretcher patients

1920s United States airliners
1920s United States military transport aircraft
F 14
Single-engined tractor aircraft
Parasol-wing aircraft
Aircraft first flown in 1929